Sopore Law College is a private law school situated beside Sopore Railway Station Road at New Light Colony in Sopore town in the Baramulla district of Jammu and Kashmir, India. It offers undergraduate 3 years LL.B, 5 Year Integrated B.A. LL.B approved by Bar Council of India (BCI), New Delhi and affiliated to University of Kashmir. Sopore Law College was established in 1992.

References

Educational institutions established in 1992
1992 establishments in Jammu and Kashmir
Colleges affiliated to University of Kashmir
Law schools in Jammu and Kashmir